The Hundred of Mingbool is a cadastral division of the County of Grey in southeastern South Australia. It was named on 24 October 1867, after an indigenous phrase of unknown meaning.

The township of Tarpeena is in the north-western corner of the hundred, with the locality of Mingbool occupying the heart of the hundred and Pleasant Park the northeast.

References

Mingbool
1867 establishments in Australia